Alessandro Bazzoni (Villafranca di Verona, July 13, 1933) is a former Italian football player, who occupied the position of goalkeeper.

Career 
He emerged from the U.S. Cerea, squad of the Veronese municipality of the same name, passed in 1957 to Lanerossi Vicenza (today's LR Vicenza Virtus), of Serie A. He made his debut in the first team on January 5, 1958, in a match against Udinese that won 0-1. In his first two seasons he alternated the position with Franco Luison, until the latter was sold to Rimini. In the first season, the 1959-1960, lost the ownership in favor of Pietro Battara, but recovered it the following year. The team remained in half board positions, achieving its only international title in 1961, the Benelux Cup, in a final won by PSV Eindhoven 2-1, with Bazzoni as the starting goalkeeper.

In October 1962, after 88 games as Serie A' starter in the Vicenza team jersey, Bazzoni moved on to the Padova that played in Serie B; with this team, the goalkeeper made 33 appearances in the category, of those, 22 were in the last season when they almost achieved the promotion to Serie A.

References

Spezia Calcio players
L.R. Vicenza players
Calcio Padova players
Italian footballers
Association football goalkeepers
1933 births
Living people
People from Villafranca di Verona
Sportspeople from the Province of Verona
Footballers from Veneto